Termitodesmidae is a family of millipedes belonging to the order Glomeridesmida.

Genera:
 Termitodesmus Silvestri, 1911

References

Glomeridesmida